The 1975-76 Arizona Wildcats men's basketball team represented the University of Arizona in the 1975-76 NCAA Division I men's basketball season. Coached by fourth year head coach Fred Snowden and led by junior center Bob Elliott, the Wildcats made their first NCAA tournament appearance in 25 seasons (and second appearance all-time), advancing to the Elite Eight. The Wildcats played their home games for the fourth season at the McKale Center in Tucson, Arizona competing as members of the Western Athletic Conference.

Previous season
The Wildcats finished the 1974-75 season 22-7 overall, 9-5 in WAC play to finish in a 3rd place in the conference, a three win improvement from the season before. While beginning the season ranked pre-season #15, the team finished the season unranked and failed to make a postseason appearance for the 24th consecutive season.

Roster 

Source

Schedule and results

|-
!colspan=12 style=| Regular season

|-
!colspan=12 style=| NCAA Tournament
|-

|-

Source

Rankings

Player statistics 

Source

References

Arizona
Arizona Wildcats men's basketball seasons
Arizona
Arizona Wildcats men's basketball
Arizona Wildcats men's basketball